Mindy Cohn (born May 20, 1966) is an American actress, who appeared on VH1's List of "100 Greatest Kid Stars". She starred as Natalie Green in the sitcom The Facts of Life from 1979 to 1988, and is known for voicing Velma Dinkley in the Scooby-Doo franchise from 2002 to 2015, succeeding B. J. Ward.

Early life
Cohn was born in Los Angeles and was raised Jewish.

Career 
Cohn was discovered by actress Charlotte Rae when Rae and the producers of The Facts of Life visited Westlake School in Holmby Hills, California, while doing research for the show. Cohn was cast as Natalie Green and portrayed the character for the series' nine-year run (1979–1988), as well as in the reunion movie (2001). In 2013, she commented on Charlotte Rae's lobbying on her behalf: "Mr. Reynolds calls me into his office. It seemed that Charlotte Rae had fallen madly in love with me, in part because I reminded her of her best childhood friend Natalie—and I was irrepressible, charming, and hilarious. So she asked the producers to create a part for me in the show. Honestly, the whole thing seemed so fantastic I didn’t know what to think." After the show, she remained friends with Rae. Two months before her acting mentor's 90th birthday in 2016, when Cohn was unavailable to attend The Facts of Life reunion interview, she sent Rae a video message praising her decades-long friend for teaching her the craft of acting. Cohn said that one of the reasons she did The Facts of Life Reunion in 2001 was that the actresses in the long-running 1980s series have been wrongly denied a cut of the syndication and DVD profits from the series. "We all never got paid and still don't get paid for DVDs and reruns... we felt we were owed."

Cohn has continued her acting career outside of The Facts of Life. In 1984 she had a leading role as the daughter alongside Stockard Channing in RKO's video production of "Table Settings". In 1986, she appeared in The Boy Who Could Fly as next-door neighbor Geneva. She also had guest appearances in other popular TV shows, including Charles in Charge (playing Buddy's sister Bunny, a young alcoholic, in the 1988 episode "Bottle Baby"), and two guest appearances in the second season of the cop drama 21 Jump Street (playing Rosa in the 1987 episode "Christmas In Saigon" and the 1988 episode "Chapel of Love"). In 2004 Cohn appeared in the WB comedy The Help.  In 2010, Cohn played the role of Violet, the leading character in Casper Andreas's movie Violet Tendencies, and appeared on the Season 8 premiere of TLC's What Not to Wear on October 29, 2010. She appeared in an episode of Hot in Cleveland on July 13, 2011, on The Secret Life of the American Teenager on March 26, 2012, in Judson Theatre Company's Bell, Book and Candle in 2013, and in The Middle on May 21, 2014. Cohn reprised her Velma Dinkley role in Lego Dimensions.

Personal life
Mindy Cohn is a breast cancer survivor, having been diagnosed with it in 2012 and was declared cancer-free in 2017. Cohn is a strong supporter of the LGBT community and has stated that she is proud to be a "fag hag." She has a degree in cultural anthropology from Loyola Marymount University and is a founding member of the weSpark cancer support center.

Filmography

Actress

Voice work

Video games

Accolades 
In 2003 Cohn was nominated for a Daytime Emmy Award for her work on the TV show What's New, Scooby-Doo?, for which she provided the voice of Velma Dinkley. She reprised her role of Velma on Scooby-Doo! Mystery Incorporated and in several other Scooby-Doo movies.

She received a positive notice from Variety for her role in the 2007 Daniel Waters comedy film Sex and Death 101.

References

External links

1966 births
Living people
Activists from California
Actresses from Los Angeles
American child actresses
American film actresses
American television actresses
American video game actresses
American voice actresses
Comedians from California
Harvard-Westlake School alumni
Jewish American actresses
Jewish American female comedians
American LGBT rights activists
Loyola Marymount University alumni
Women civil rights activists
20th-century American actresses
21st-century American actresses
20th-century American comedians
21st-century American comedians
21st-century American Jews